Smith's Wood is a residential area in the north of the Metropolitan Borough of Solihull in the West Midlands of England. It is a civil parish with a population of 10,476, according to the 2011 census.

The A452 and M6 form its north and east boundary, Kingshurst and Fordbridge its south, and Castle Bromwich its west.

Smith's Wood also has several parks that are being redeveloped. The Smith's Wood estate is the site of the ancient 'Smith's Wood' – a historical woodland which was once part of the forest of Arden. It was officially designated a Local Nature Reserve in 2004 and is going to be enhanced as part of the regeneration project along with other green spaces.

Smith's Wood is home to Smith's Wood Boys Football Club, a large boys' football club established in 1970. Nottingham Forest forward Jamie Ward is from Smith's Wood and attended Smith's Wood Sports College.

Many flats and houses have been demolished and rebuilt in Smith's Wood as part of the regeneration of North Solihull. New features have included a high street, a community hub, and a new private housing estate on Burton's Farm Park. The Woodlands campus of Solihull College was completed in 2006.

Education
There are five primary schools; also two special schools and a secondary school Smith's Wood Academy on adjacent sites.

Ethnicity
At the 2001 Census, Smith’s Wood had the 6th highest proportion of non-white residents (Black, Asian, Mixed Race and Chinese) in Solihull (6%), although all wards in the Borough are below the West Midlands average of 11%. In 2001, Smith’s Wood had the Borough’s highest proportion of mixed race (3%) and black residents (3%).

Democracy
Smith's Wood ward is one of 17 wards within Solihull Borough Council. The ward has traditionally been represented by the Labour Party however Green Party representatives have been returned in 2008 and every year since 2011. Consequently, all three councillors for Smith's Wood are now Green Party representatives.

References

External links

 Smith's Wood Boys Football Club
  North Solihull Regeneration Website 
  Smiths Wood Sports College Website 
  Smiths Wood Community Primary School Website

Areas of the West Midlands (county)
Civil parishes in the West Midlands (county)
Solihull
Local Nature Reserves in the West Midlands (county)